Albert Henderson may refer to:
Albert Henderson (soccer) (1881–1947), Canadian amateur football (soccer) player
Albert Henderson (actor) (1915–2004), American actor
Albert H. Henderson, American lawyer, politician, and judge from New York
Albert John Henderson (1920–1999), US federal judge

See also
Bert Henderson (disambiguation)